Andrey Alekseyevich Chernyshov (Russian: Андрей Алексеевич Чернышов; born 7 January 1968) is a Russian football manager and former player. He also previously managed the Serbian First League club Radnički Novi Beograd.

Club career
A centre-back, Chernyshov played for numerous clubs in his homeland, including three Moscow-based clubs Dynamo, Spartak and Torpedo, as well as Rubin Kazan. He also represented various clubs abroad, such as Sturm Graz, DSV Leoben and BSV Bad Bleiberg in Austria, PAOK in Greece, SpVgg Greuther Fürth in Germany, as well as Royal Antwerp in Belgium.

International career
At international level, Chernyshov was a member of the Soviet Union national youth team that won the 1990 UEFA European Under-21 Championship. He also represented the Commonwealth of Independent States at UEFA Euro 1992.

Managerial career
Shortly after retiring from the game, Chernyshov became manager of Russia at under-21 level in August 2002. He also worked at numerous clubs, including stints at Spartak Moscow, Dinamo Tbilisi, Vitebsk, Dynamo Bryansk and Akzhayik. In July 2014, Chernyshov was appointed director of football at Torpedo Moscow.

In October 2015, Chernyshov became manager of Serbian club Spartak Subotica. He left the side at the end of the 2016–17 season.

On 12 May 2021, Chernyshov was appointed the new manager of Kolkata based I-League club Mohammedan Sporting for their 2021–22 season. Under his guidance, Mohammedan began the 2021 Durand Cup campaign, and reached to the final, defeating FC Bengaluru United 4–2. On 3 October 2021, they lost the title winning match 1–0 to ISL side FC Goa and finished as runners-up.

On 18 November, Chernyshov guided Mohammedan clinching their 12th Calcutta Football League title after forty long years, defeating Railway FC 1–0. Under his coaching and Nikola Stojanović's captaincy, Mohammedan for the first time, ran for their maiden national league title in 2021–22 I-League season, but finished as runners-up after a 2–1 defeat to Gokulam Kerala at the end. In December 2022, he was replaced by Spanish manager Kibu Vicuña in midway of the 2022–23 I-League season.

Managerial statistics

Honours

Player
Spartak Moscow
 Russian Top League: 1992
 Soviet Cup: 1991–92
Sturm Graz
 Austrian Cup: 1995–96

Soviet Union
 UEFA Under-21 Championship: 1990

Manager
Mohammedan Sporting
CFL Premier Division A: 2021, 2022
Durand Cup runner-up: 2021
I-League runner-up: 2021–22

References

External links
 
 
 
 

2. Bundesliga players
Association football defenders
Austrian Football Bundesliga players
2. Liga (Austria) players
Belgian Pro League players
BSV Bad Bleiberg players
DSV Leoben players
Dual internationalists (football)
Expatriate football managers in Belarus
Expatriate football managers in Georgia (country)
Expatriate football managers in Greece
Expatriate football managers in Kazakhstan
Expatriate football managers in Kuwait
Expatriate football managers in Serbia
Expatriate footballers in Austria
Expatriate footballers in Belgium
Expatriate footballers in Germany
Expatriate footballers in Greece
FC Akzhayik managers
FC Dinamo Tbilisi managers
FC Dynamo Moscow players
FC Rubin Kazan players
FC Spartak Moscow managers
FC Spartak Moscow players
FC Torpedo Moscow players
FC Vitebsk managers
FK Spartak Subotica managers
PAOK FC players
Royal Antwerp F.C. players
Russia international footballers
Russian expatriate football managers
Russian expatriate footballers
Russian expatriate sportspeople in Austria
Russian expatriate sportspeople in Belarus
Russian expatriate sportspeople in Belgium
Russian expatriate sportspeople in Georgia (country)
Russian expatriate sportspeople in Germany
Russian expatriate sportspeople in Greece
Russian expatriate sportspeople in Kazakhstan
Russian expatriate sportspeople in Serbia
Russian football managers
Russian footballers
Russian Premier League managers
Russian Premier League players
Serbian SuperLiga managers
SK Sturm Graz players
Soviet footballers
Soviet Top League players
Soviet Union international footballers
Soviet Union under-21 international footballers
Footballers from Moscow
SpVgg Greuther Fürth players
Super League Greece players
UEFA Euro 1992 players
1968 births
Living people
Al-Fahaheel FC managers
A.E. Sparta P.A.E. managers
Kuwait Premier League managers
Russian expatriate sportspeople in Kuwait
Expatriate football managers in North Macedonia
Russian expatriate sportspeople in India
Expatriate football managers in India
Mohammedan SC (Kolkata) managers